Prabhu Sah (Nepali: प्रभु साह) is a Nepalese politician and a former Minister of Urban Development of Government of Nepal. A long time communist politician Sah is now an independent politician since a deviation was developed in communist parties of Nepal.

Political life 
In the 2008 Nepalese Constituent Assembly election he was elected from the Rautahat 3 (constituency), winning 11,625 votes. In the 2013 Nepalese Constituent Assembly election  he was elected from the Rautahat 3 (constituency), winning 13,009 votes. He was elected, in the elections held in 2017, as a member of the House of Representatives from his home district. Sah also served as  Minister for Law and Constitutional Affairs under Jhalanath Khanal cabinet in 2011, also Minister of Urban Development under Sher Bahadur Deuba cabinet and Minister of Land Management, Cooperatives and Poverty Alleviation.

Literature 
He wrote many books inspired by his life. Some of them are Madheshi Mukti ka Aadharharu, Mera Yatana Ka 270 Deen haru, Janayudha ra Madhesi Mukti ko Karyadisa, etc.

Electoral history 
He was elected to the Member of House of Representatives in 2017, Member of 2013 Constituent Assembly and Member of 2008 Constituent Assembly.

2017 legislative elections 

Rautahat 3 (constituency)

2013 Constituent Assembly election 

Rautahat 3 (constituency)

 2008 Constituent Assembly election 

Rautahat 3 (constituency)

See also 

 2021 split in Communist Party of Nepal (Maoist Centre)

References

Government ministers of Nepal
Communist Party of Nepal (Maoist Centre) politicians
Nepal Communist Party (NCP) politicians
Nepal MPs 2017–2022
Living people
1974 births
People from Rautahat District
Members of the 2nd Nepalese Constituent Assembly
Members of the 1st Nepalese Constituent Assembly
Communist Party of Nepal (Unified Marxist–Leninist) politicians
Nepal MPs 2022–present